Cushitic-speaking peoples are the ethnic groups who speak Cushitic languages natively. Today, Cushitic languages are spoken primarily in the Horn of Africa, with minorities speaking Cushitic languages to the north and south in Egypt, the Sudan, Kenya, and Tanzania.

History 
Donald N. Levine held that Proto-Cushitic was spoken on the Ethiopian Highlands by 5000–4000 BC. Roger Blench hypothesizes that speakers of Cushitic languages may have been the producers of "Leiterband" pottery, which influenced the pottery of the Khartoum Neolithic. Eric Becker, in a 2011 investigation of human remains at the Wadi Howar Leiterband site, finds the hypothetical connection of Leiterband pottery to speakers of a Cushitic language improbable.

North Cushitic
The Medjay and the Blemmyes—the latter possibly a subgroup of the former—are believed by many historians to be ancestors of modern-day speakers of Beja; there appears to be linguistic continuity, suggesting that a language ancestral to Beja was spoken in the Nile Valley by the time of the Twelfth Dynasty of Egypt. From an analysis of the lexicon of the Nubian languages, Marianne Bechhaus-Gerst proposes that when Nubian speakers first reached the Nile Valley ca 1500 BC, they encountered Cushitic-speaking peoples from whom they borrowed a large number of words, mainly connected with livestock production.

Possible Lost Branch
Roger Blench proposes that an extinct and otherwise unattested branch of Cushitic may be responsible for some of the pastoral cultural features of Khoekhoe people ca 2000 years BP. As there are very few Khoekhoe words for which a Cushitic etymology is possible based on existing Cushitic languages, Blench proposes that the contact was with speakers of a now extinct and otherwise unattested Cushitic language which was replaced through assimilation during the Bantu expansion.

Contemporary Ethnic groups

Speakers of North Cushitic
 Beja people

Speakers of Agaw languages
 Agaw people
 Awi people
 Bilen people
 Qemant people
 Beta Israel

Speakers of Lowland East Cushitic languages
 Afar people
 Saho people
 Irob people
 Arbore people
 Daasanach people
 El Molo people (most no longer speak a Cushitic language)
 Yaaku people (the Yaaku language is no longer a living language, but there is a revival movement)
 Oromo people
 Boorana
 Barento
 Orma
 Waata (Oromo-speaking)
 Konso people
 Dirasha people, who speak Dirasha language
 Bussa people, who are shifting away from Bussa language to Oromo, Dirasha, and Amharic
 Somalis
 Rendille people
 Ariaal people
 Aweer people
 Garre
 Tunni

Speakers of Highland East Cushitic languages
 Burji speakers of the Burji language
 Sidama people
 Gedeo people
 Hadiya people
 Kambaata people
 Halaba people

Speakers of West Rift Southern Cushitic languages
 Burunge people
 Iraqw people
 Alagwa people
 Gorowa people

References